Due to the restructuring that carried out the Miss Peru Organization split in two one for Miss Peru Universe and another one for Miss World Peru.

Jimena Elías Roca, former Miss Teen Peru 2005 and represented Peru in the Miss Teen International that same year, where she placed as 1st runner-up, was elected Miss Peru Universe on April 16, 2007. She was handpicked by the Corporacion Nacional de la Belleza who was in charge of sending their delegate to Miss Universe and other minor pageants. On May 2, Elías traveled to compete in the Miss Universe 2007 in Mexico City, Mexico. Later Odilia Garcia was appointed to represent Peru in the Miss Earth 2007 in Philippines, when she reach a spot in the Top 8.

Placements

2007 Pageant
The Miss Perú 2007 pageant was held on June 15, 2007. That year, 24 candidates were competing for the national crown. The chosen winner represented Peru in the Miss World 2007. The rest of the finalists would enter in different pageants.

Placements

Special Awards

 Best Regional Costume: La Libertad - Luisa Fernanda Monteverde
 Most Beautiful Face: Arequipa - Jackeline Spoljaric
 Best Hair: Loreto - Fresia Ortega
 Miss Congeniality: Ucayali - Nicole Scekic Schuppli
 Miss Silhouette: Lima - Grecia De Martis
 Miss Style: Huánuco - Sofía del Pinho
 Miss Smile: Cuzco - Lizibel de las Casas

Delegates

 Amazonas - Grecia Solano
 Áncash - Rocío Carolina Guerrero
 Apurímac - Georgette Cárdenas
 Arequipa - Jackeline Spoljaric
 Ayacucho - Jessica Barrantes
 Cajamarca - Nona Abanto Velásquez
 Callao - Karla Flores
 Cuzco - Lizibel de las Casas
 Distrito Capital - Grecia De Martis
 Europe Perú - Natalie Doering
 Huancavelica - Patricia Ríos
 Huánuco - Sofía de Pinho

 Junín - Leslie Blanco
 La Libertad - Luisa Fernanda Monteverde
 Lambayeque - Luciana León Ferreyro
 Loreto - Fresia Ortega Pérez
 Madre de Dios - Ana Lucía García Urrutia
 Moquegua - Agatha Navarro
 Pasco - Alba Trece
 San Martín - Solange Paredes Díaz
 Tacna - Cinthia Calderón Ulloa
 Tumbes - Gabriela Vásquez
 Ucayali - Nicole Scekic Schuppli
 USA Perú - Melissa Huddleston

Trivia
 Miss Piura, Kathia Aponte Camposano, withdrew Miss Peru 2007 pageant. She accusing the National Organization for Sexual Harassment and Racial Discrimination.

Background Music
 Opening Number: Banda Santa Lucía de Moche - "La Concheperla"
 Special Guests Singer
 Pepe Alva - "Matarina"
 Fanny Lu - "No te pido Flores"

References

Miss Peru
2007 in Peru
2007 beauty pageants